Journey Through the Past is a 1973 film by Neil Young. Originally shot in 16mm format and then transferred for theatrical release the experimental film is a self-directed combination of concert footage from 1966 onward, backstage footage and semi-fantastic art film-like sequences. Young's directorial debut, it was received poorly by critics. The film premiered at the United States Film Festival in Dallas, Texas, in April 1973. It was released in theaters in the United States in May, 1974. The film was released on DVD and Blu-ray in 2009 with the Neil Young Archives.

References

External links 
 

Documentary films about rock music and musicians
American documentary films
American rock music films
American avant-garde and experimental films
Films directed by Neil Young
1973 films
1973 directorial debut films
1970s English-language films
1970s American films